Guangji may refer to:

Guangji County, former name of Wuxue, city in Hubei, China
Guangji Temple, in Beijing, China